Sextus Pomponius was a jurist who lived during the reigns of Hadrian, Antoninus Pius and Marcus Aurelius. Other writers have expressed a view that the name Pomponius Sextus was shared by another jurist, although Puchta (Cursus der Institution, vol. i. p. 444) suggested the assumption of two "Pomponii" lacked reason. 

He wrote a book on the law up to the time of Hadrian, known as the  Enchiridion of Sextus Pomponius.

References

Ancient Roman jurists
2nd-century Romans
Year of birth unknown
Year of death unknown
Pomponius